Truncatellina atomus is a species of minute air-breathing land snail, a terrestrial animal pulmonate gastropod mollusk in the family Truncatellinidae.

This species is endemic to the Canary Islands.
Endemic fauna of the Canary Islands

References

Truncatellinidae
Gastropods described in 1852
Taxonomy articles created by Polbot